The first day of summer is an annual public holiday in Iceland that is celebrated on the first Thursday after 18 April (some time between 19-25 April).

It is a celebration of the start of the first summer month of the old Icelandic calendar. The old calendar had six months of short days (winter) and six months of nightless days (summer), so even though the climate of late April in Iceland is not very summer-like (on fourteen occasions between 1949 and 2015 the average temperature in the capital, Reykjavík, has been below freezing), the day marks the lengthening of the days and the harsh winter being over.

Parades and organized entertainment are held in various places around Iceland on the first day of summer.

According to folk belief, a good summer would be sure to ensue if the temperature dropped below freezing right before the first day of summer. People would place a bowl of water outside for the night and hope that it would freeze.

See also 
 Summer solstice
 Spring equinox

References 

Icelandic culture
Public holidays in Iceland
April observances
Thursday